Pueblo is an unincorporated community and census-designated place in San Miguel County, New Mexico, United States. Its population was 125 as of the 2010 census. New Mexico State Road 3 passes through the community.

Geography

Demographics

Education
It is in the West Las Vegas Schools school district. West Las Vegas High School is the area high school.

References

Census-designated places in New Mexico
Census-designated places in San Miguel County, New Mexico